Sukhendu Sekhar Roy is an Indian politician belonging to the Trinamool Congress. He was elected to the Rajya Sabha the Upper house of Indian parliament from West Bengal in 2011.

References 

1949 births
Living people
People from English Bazar
Rajya Sabha members from West Bengal
Trinamool Congress politicians from West Bengal
Bengali Hindus
West Bengal politicians
20th-century Bengalis
Indian newspaper editors
20th-century Indian journalists
Journalists from West Bengal